Héroes del Silencio was a Spanish rock band from Zaragoza (Aragon, Spain) formed by Juan Valdivia in 1984. In 1988 they released their official first studio album, El Mar No Cesa, then in 1990 they released their second album Senderos de Traición, El Espíritu del Vino was their third album released in 1993 and in 1995 they released their last studio album to date, the often praised Avalancha.

Albums

Studio albums

Live albums

Compilation albums

Singles

Box sets

 Edición del Milenio (1999)
Tour 2007 Deluxe Box Set (2007)

Extended plays

 Héroe de Leyenda (1987)

References

Discographies of Spanish artists
Rock music group discographies